is a former Japanese football player and manager.

Playing career
Sonoda was born in Nagasaki Prefecture on February 6, 1969. After graduating from high school, he joined All Nippon Airways in 1988. He played many matches as offensive midfielder from first season. However his opportunity to play decreased from 1991 under new manager Shu Kamo and he could not play at all in the match from 1992. In 1994, he moved to Japan Football League club Fujieda Blux (later Fukuoka Blux, Avispa Fukuoka). He played as regular player and the club won the champions 1995 and was promoted to J1 League. In 1997, he moved to Sagawa Express Tokyo. However could not play at all in the match and retired end of 1999 season.

Coaching career
After retirement, Sonoda became a coach for Sagawa Express Tokyo in 2000. In 2004, he became a manager and managed the club in 1 season.

Club statistics

References

External links

1969 births
Living people
Association football people from Nagasaki Prefecture
Japanese footballers
Japan Soccer League players
J1 League players
Japan Football League (1992–1998) players
Japan Football League players
Yokohama Flügels players
Avispa Fukuoka players
Sagawa Shiga FC players
Japanese football managers
Association football midfielders